Ritschenhausen station is a railway station situated in the Thuringian village of Ritschenhausen on the Neudietendorf–Ritschenhausen and the Schweinfurt–Meiningen lines. The station is a former border station between the Bavarian and the Prussian state railways.

References

Railway stations in Thuringia
Buildings and structures in Schmalkalden-Meiningen
Railway stations in Germany opened in 1874